Hilgers is a German surname. Notable people with the surname include:

Bernhard Josef Hilgers (1803–1874) was a German Catholic Church historian
Jan Hilgers (1886–1945), Dutch aviator
Josef Hilgers (1858–1918), German Jesuit
Michael Hilgers (born 1966), German field hockey player
Michael Hilgers (born 1971), Author of textbooks on vehicle technology
Walter Hilgers (born 1959), German classical tubist

German-language surnames